The Advisory Centre on WTO Law (ACWL) is an international organisation established in 2001 to provide legal advice on WTO law, support in WTO dispute settlement proceedings and training in WTO law to least developed countries, developing countries and customs territories, and countries with economies in transition.

The Centre, which is based in Geneva, has 37 Members: 11 developed country Members (Australia joined in 2011), and 27 Members entitled to the services of the ACWL (i.e. developing countries or developing customs territories or economies in transition as listed in Annex II to the Agreement Establishing the Centre). Least developed countries are entitled to the services of the ACWL without having to become Members thereof.

Legal basis

The centre was established by the Agreement Establishing the Advisory Centre on WTO Law, which was concluded in 1999.

Institutional structure

The General Assembly, the Management Board and the Executive Director.

The General Assembly is made up of the ACWL Members and monitors the financial administration of the Centre, adopts its annual budget, and oversees its functioning.

The Management Board is composed of six people who act in their personal capacities: three are nominated by the developing and economy in transition Members, two by developed country ACWL Members, and one by the least developed countries. The Board takes the decisions for the efficient and effective operation of the Centre and reports to the General Assembly.

The Executive Director represents the Centre externally, appoints staff and manages the day-to-day operations of the ACWL. He/she is also ex officio a member of the Management Board.

References

External links
Official website
 Kim Van der Borght (1999), "The advisory center on the WTO law: advancing fairness and equality", Journal of International Economic Law, 2 (4), 723-728.
 Fabio Spadi (2001), "Il centro consultivo sul diritto dell'Organizzazione mondiale del commercio", Diritto del commercio internazionale 15 (3), 767-775. (in Italian)

World Trade Organization
Intergovernmental organizations established by treaty
Organizations established in 2001
International organisations based in Switzerland